Constantin Drăgănescu (27 September 1936 – 26 March 2020) was a Romanian actor. He appeared in more than fifty films since 1972.

Selected filmography

References

External links 

1936 births
2020 deaths
Romanian male film actors